The Santo Anastácio River is a river of São Paulo state in southeastern Brazil.

See also
List of rivers of São Paulo

References
Brazilian Ministry of Transport

Rivers of São Paulo (state)
Tributaries of the Paraná River